Anthony George Coleman (born 2 May 1945) is an English former footballer who made 250 appearances in the Football League playing for Tranmere Rovers, Preston North End, Doncaster Rovers, Manchester City, Sheffield Wednesday, Blackpool, Southport and Stockport County. He played on the left wing.

Coleman was known for his disciplinary problems during his career. He was thrown out of the youth team at Stoke City, deemed unmanageable by Preston North End and was almost banned for life by the FA after attacking a referee whilst at Doncaster Rovers.

In November 2009, an interview with Coleman was broadcast on Manchester City football show Blue Tuesday on BBC Manchester in which he spoke about his life in Australia and revealed that he intended to raise money by selling his football medals.

Career statistics
Source:

Honours

Manchester City
 First Division Championship 1968 (League champions)
 FA Cup winner 1969

Doncaster Rovers
 Fourth Division Championship 1965

References 

1945 births
Living people
Footballers from Liverpool
English footballers
Tranmere Rovers F.C. players
Preston North End F.C. players
Doncaster Rovers F.C. players
Manchester City F.C. players
Sheffield Wednesday F.C. players
Blackpool F.C. players
Southport F.C. players
Stockport County F.C. players
Macclesfield Town F.C. players
English Football League players
Cape Town City F.C. (NFL) players
Guisborough Town F.C. players
Ellesmere Port Town F.C. players
People from Ellesmere Port
Association football wingers
FA Cup Final players
National Football League (South Africa) players